Hofsteniidae is a family of acoels. This family contains seven species in three genera. 

This worm ranges in size from 100 μm for embryos to 500 μm for adults, and exhibits "whole-body regeneration" capability, where entire body parts regenerate when removed from the body. They have a simple nervous system and a bowel sac with no way out.

Genera
There are three genera in the family Hofsteniidae.
Hofstenia Bock, 1923
Hofsteniola Papi, 1957
Marcusiola Steinböck, 1966

Species
There are seven species in the family Hofsteniidae.

Notes

References

Acoelomorphs